Mapaki is a small town and seat of the chiefdom of Paki Massabong in Bombali District in the Northern Province of Sierra Leone.

Populated places in Sierra Leone
Northern Province, Sierra Leone